Smoking in Australia is restricted in enclosed public places, workplaces, in areas of public transport and near underage events, except new laws in New South Wales that ban smoking within ten metres of children's play spaces.

The smoking population of Australia is 11.6%. Within Australia, individuals between 25–29 years and 40–49 years had a higher prevalence of smoking that all the other age brackets. It also established that individuals 70 years and over were 6% less likely to smoke than all other age groups.

In particular, the most common form of smoking in Australia is tobacco smoking which is practised in a myriad of types. Data collected by the Cancer Council of Victoria and the Australian Institute of Health and Welfare's National Drug Strategy Household Surveys, explicate that the majority form of tobacco in Australia that was smoked, was factory made cigarettes.  Likewise, a study conducted by the International Tobacco Control (ITC) established the prevalence of "Roll your own tobacco", was being utilised by 9% of the population, constituting mostly of males having a demographics of a lower level of income, and poor education. Unbranded loose tobacco (chop-chop) is also smoked by smokers, sold without government taxation, being a cheaper option and therefore utilised as an alternative to factory made cigarettes. 'Chop-chop' is prevalent among young Australian adults, as stated by the  recent surveys conducted by the National Drug Strategy Household, which concluded that in 2016, 3.8% of smokers aged 14+ used unbranded loose tobacco. This survey also identified other forms of smoking such as the e-cigarettes being utilised by 9% of the population and finally water-pipe tobacco (shishas, hookahs and argillas).

Cannabis is also another drug which is smoked rolled in a cigarette. The usage of cannabis in 2016 among the Australia population is 10.4%.

History 

In the early 1700s, tobacco smoking was introduced to the north dwelling indigenous communities through the visitation of the Indonesian fishermen. However, the British customs and behaviour of the utilisation of tobacco was introduced into the Australian culture in 1788, due to the colonisation of Australia by the Europeans, and evidently, these tobacco related behaviours rapidly spread throughout the Aboriginal community, the free settlers and the convicts from Britain. When first introduced within Australia, the supply of tobacco was restricted within the Australian community, however by the 1800s tobacco was a fundamental item being used as a reward for a servants labour, or antagonistically used as a punishment for convicts, due to its addictive side effects. Eventually, by 1819, 80 to 90 percent of the labour force were smokers.

By the 1880s the production of cigarettes were completely mechanised, however was often chosen over dandies. More importantly, the cheapness and ease of accessibility of these manufactured cigarettes, revolutionised the way Australian's smoke tobacco. This cigarette was prevalent in the World War 1, as 60% of the tobacco rations donated to the trenches, were in the cigarette form. Cigarette use also rapidly increased up to 70% during World War 1, in contrast to the usage before the war.

In the 1920s, societal views began to transition of women partaking in smoking behaviours and thus over the next several decades companies began to advertise smoking to women. The introduction of women in the workforce, led to greater freedom of women, and hence smoking rates within Australia increased.

By the 1930s the Australian Government began assisting the tobacco industry by introducing the Local Leaf Content Scheme, which required local tobacco to be used up in the manufacturing of cigarettes in Australia. However, in the 1990s the Industry Commission Inquiry found that tobacco had the greatest subsidisation in agriculture within Australia, and thus the Local Leaf Content Scheme was abolished. As a result, the tobacco industry within Australia declined to the oncoming threat of international competition. Currently, no commercial farming of tobacco occurs within Australia, and all tobacco products are imported from overseas.

Smoking patterns in Australia

Decline in smoking 
Daily tobacco smoking in Australia has been declining since 1991, where the smoking population was 24.3%. Correspondingly, in 1995 23.8% of adults smoked daily. This figure also decreased in 2001, where 22.4% of the population used to smoke. This constant trend of the reduction of daily smoking has continued within these past 2 decades, with 16.1% of adults smoking in 2011-12, and finally 14.5% of the population smoking daily in 2014-15, which constitutes 2.6 million adults within Australia. However, most recently it was found that the smoking population of Australia in 2016 was 12.2%, and thus, the smoking population in Australia has almost halved since 1991.

Conversely, the rate of decline for smoking has become steady among recent years, with some sources arguing that the smoking percentage within Australia did not decline between the years of 2013 to 2016.

Decline of smoking in Australia from 1991 to 2016

Smoking prevalence in all states and territories 
The daily smoking percentage in Northern Territory, has typically had the highest smoking rates within Australia. The high smoking rates within Northern Territory resonates with the high percentage of Indigenous individuals living there, as the smoking prevalence of the Indigenous in 2014-15 was 39%. Further, 26% of the Northern Territory population consists of individuals with Aboriginal and Torres Strait Islander heritage, which is 5% less in all the other states and territories within Australia. However, since 1995 Northern Territory has had the largest decrease in daily smoking rates in comparison to all other states, from 35.6% to 21% in 2014-15.

Smoking rates between males and females 
The smoking percentage of men in 2016 is 16%, while the smoking percentage of women is 12%. Men have consistently shown to have a higher tendency to smoke daily than women. However, daily smoking percentage for both males and females were 27.3% and 20.3% respectively in 1995, expounding a significant reduction in smoking prevalence for both genders.

In 2017-18, men aged 18–24 years, around 17.5% of that age bracket smoked daily. This percentage remained constant for all age groups until the age of 55-64, were the daily smoking percentage dropped to 16.5%. This figure for daily smoking, further decreased for men at the age of 75+, dropping to a percentage of 5.1%.

Conversely, in 2017-18 it was found that women between the ages of 18-24, had a daily smoking percentage of 17.5%. This figure increased to 14.7% of women between the age bracket of 45-54, and eventually decreasing to 7.5% for women between the ages of 65-74. Finally, this percentage further dropped to 3.7%, to women 75+.

Deaths and health related risk factors caused by smoking in Australia 

The highest number of preventable deaths that occur in Australia is as a direct result of smoking, with a death toll of 15500 every year. Smoking is associated with causing a myriad of other types of diseases, such as heart disease, diabetes, stroke and different forms of cancers. In particular, cancer was found to be the leading cause of tobacco related deaths. Lung cancer has the highest death toll within Australia, which is caused by smoking. In 2003, tobacco was found to be responsible for 7.8% of disease and injury that occurred within Australia.

Underage smoking

Smoking prevalence of underage adults 
The smoking prevalence of underage adults in Australia has oscillated over time. During the 1980s, smoking rates among young adults began to decrease, but increased during the early 1990s, while finally in the 1996, this percentage began to decrease again. Most recently, in 2017, the underage smoking population in Australia was found to be lowest ever recorded.

The downward trend of the reduction of smoking amongst underage individuals from the late 1990s, was accompanied with the introduction of the National Tobacco Campaign. Although failing, to reduce the smoking prevalence amongst adults within Australia, the campaign proved to be a success in reducing smoke rates amongst young adults. Factors such tobacco taxes and stricter laws to restrict tobacco sales to minors, also played a huge role in decreasing the smoking prevalence amongst the youth. Likewise, the decline in smoking rates from 2011-14 came in light of the establishment of the National Tobacco Strategy in 2012, and a myriad of other factors such as the new plain packaging laws, and introducing more smoke free environments. The slow decline of smoking rates among underage individuals, in recent years can be from a result of less government funded media campaigns and the introduction of new tobacco products within Australia, that entice young adults to smoke.

Smoking percentage of young adults between 16-17 that smoked in the past week
Smoking percentage of young adults between 12-15 that smoked in the past week

Accessibility of cigarettes to young adults  
In 1996, it was found that 35% of males and 40% of females aged 12–17, most commonly obtained their cigarettes through their friends. This way of young adults accessing cigarettes, remained as the main source of cigarette accessibility for males, whilst decreasing with age for females. Nonetheless, for male and female young adults between the ages of 16-17, their primary source of cigarette accessibility was through illegal purchases in stores, as 45% of females and 55% of males, in this age category reported to have purchased their own cigarettes.

However, the second most frequent way that young adults between the ages of 12-15 acquired cigarettes, was from older individuals who obtained the cigarettes for them.

Underage Australian students who participated in smoking, purchased cigarettes most commonly from outlets such as retail markets and service stations. It was found that 29% of smokers that were the age of 12, obtained cigarettes from vending machines, in comparison to 5% of older aged teenagers who obtained cigarettes in this manner.

The purchase of single cigarettes, was also a common way that underage smokers, obtained cigarettes, with 21% of males and 12% of females, purchasing single cigarettes regardless of their ban in most jurisdictions. This type of purchase became less common with one's age, as 29% of smokers that were the age of 12, were reported to purchase single cigarettes in comparison to 5% of individuals between 16 and 17 years of age that purchased this type of cigarette.

Underage smoking laws

Western Australia 

The Tobacco Products Control Act (2006), prohibits the sale and supply of cigarettes to minors. The power to monitor and enforce this act, lies with the Health Department of Western Australia. This department aims to reduce children's access to tobacco by investigating possible breaches of this act and increasing community aid to educate the minors.

New South Wales 

New South Wales has adopted a comprehensive program following the amendments to the Public Health Act 1991, in 1996, due to the rising rate of underage smoking, and their ease in accessing tobacco products. This program ensured that tobacco retailers asked for identification to ensure that customers were above the age of 18, and finally an educational strategy to increase general awareness about the requirements legislated under the Public Health Act 1991. The responsibility of monitoring the compliance of the Public Health Act 1991, falls with the Environmental Health Officers, who prosecute retailers when this legislation is breached.

South Australia 
The measures implemented by South Australia to prevent and minimise the supply of tobacco to underage individual's is regulated through the introduction of the Tobacco Product Regulation Act 1997, which ultimately increased the penalties when tobacco laws are breached. This legislation does not only involve identification of an individual, as an only defence to combat the supply of tobacco to underage individuals, which is the circumstance in other states and territories.

Victoria 
Underage access to tobacco in Victoria is handled through a combination of domestic laws and local projects. The Tobacco Act 1987, makes it illegal for tobacco retailers in Victoria to sell tobacco products to individuals under the age of 18. Educational programs run by QUIT Victoria, assists in informing retailers and making them aware about legislative issues. The amendments to the Tobacco Act 1987, that have been passed recently has also increased the fines for violation of tobacco laws. Unlike other states there is no current statewide compliance program. However, a high number of councils within Victoria undertake their own compliance testing as the Department of Health and Human Services provides a password protected, educational and enforcement resources online, to assist them in understanding the obligations set by The Tobacco Act 1987, and therefore enforcing and ensuring retailers are compliant.

Tasmania 
The smoking age in Tasmania was raised up to 18 years of age in February 1997, to tackle the increasing rates of underage smoking within the state. The provisions that separated tobacco from confectionery in Tasmania were introduced through the enactment of the Public Health Act 1977. This legislation also allows the government to prosecute retailers or seize tobacco products from underage individuals who are found to be smoking. However, Tasmanian laws doesn't require the identification of age as the only justification to sell tobacco to individuals under the age of 18, as is the circumstance in some states.

Northern Territory 

Between the period of 1996 to 1997, compliance surveys of retailers were conducted throughout Northern Territory, which concluded that 22% of tobacco retailers were fine with selling tobacco products to customers of the age of 15. Due to these results, from 1996 to 1999, educational campaigns were introduced to educate retailers of their responsibilities and ensure that they comply with the Tobacco Act.

The Tobacco Control Act 2002 outlaws the supply of tobacco products to individuals under the age of 18. This act was amended in 2019, coming into effect on 1 July 2019, which legislated that tobacco vending machines will not be allowed to be placed in a liquor licensed area, were an individual under the age of 18 can enter and easily access it.

Future plans to stop underage smoking in Northern Territory, includes The Tobacco Action Plan 2019-2023, which aims to acknowledge the standards under the National Partnership Agreement on Preventive Health (NPAPH) and ultimately control tobacco supply to children under the age of 18, by implementing distinctive activities to improve underage smoking rates in Northern Territory.

Queensland 

Due to the increasing underage smoking rates in Queensland, the Queensland Tobacco Products (Prevention of Supply to Children) Act 1998 was introduced, raising the legal age of purchasing tobacco from 16 to 18 years old of age. The Queensland government also provides training to employees who work at tobacco retailers to ensure that underage individuals can't purchase tobacco from there.

Tobacco-controlling campaigns

The National Campaign against drug abuse 
In 1995, the Ministerial Council on Drug Strategy (MCDS) was created, consisting of a myriad of political leaders and ministers all around Australia. The MCDS introduced the National Campaign Against Drug Abuse, later renamed as the National Drug Strategy.

In 1990, the National Campaign Against Drug Abuse, launched a $2 million advertisement, 'Smoking - who needs it?', which was aimed at young girls. This advertisement followed an increase in the percentage of young women adults wanting to reduce their daily smoking rates.

The National Tobacco Campaign 
In 1997, a nationwide campaign was introduced, involving all the Quit  campaigns  in all states and territories, and most importantly, the Commonwealth of Australia.

During the initial phase of The National Tobacco Campaign, $4.5 million was bestowed to this campaign by the government for advertising, while the Quit campaigns around Australia contributed $3.29 million. It was concluded that during this period, the National Tobacco Campaign decreased the smoking prevalence within Australia by 1.4%, while most importantly stopped 10,000 smokers from being diagnosed with lung cancer, and finally, stopped 2500 possible strokes from occurring. It was also found that this campaign allowed 55,000 deaths to be avoided.

The advertising conducted by this campaign essentially focused on smokers between the ages of 18-40, being highly successful due to the federal, state and lobby groups, working together. The advertisements recognised, that in order for an individual to quit smoking, one must achieve new understandings, that by giving up smoking an individual will benefit more than they loose.

The campaign introduced 6 media campaigns (named as 'Artery', 'Lung', 'Tumour', 'Brain', 'Eye' and 'Tar') between the years of 1997 to 2000, while ultimately appealing to smokers of low socioeconomic's, by displaying that these individuals had the highest smoking rates and the highest levels of smoking related diseases.

Cigarette packaging

During 2006, a new type of packaging was released for tobacco packaging, consisting of graphical warnings about the consequences of smoking. Ever since March 2006, items afflicted with tobacco in any way, that were brought into or manufactured within Australia, needed to display the new graphical images, warning individuals about the dangers of smoking.

Likewise, the legislation that required all tobacco products to have plain packaging is the Tobacco Plain Packaging Act 2011 and the Tobacco Plain Packaging Regulations 2011, which introduced new requirements of packaging, to tobacco-free products.

Australia's specifications of packaging tobacco and non tobacco products, is therefore outlined under the Competition and Consumer (Tobacco) Information Standard (2011), which states that graphical images about the negative effects of smoking to the body, must cover 75% of the front, and 90% of the back, of a cigarette packet. It also states that these images must also cover 75% of the back of non-tobacco smoking products.

By implementing these specifications onto cigarette packets, studies have shown that young people are less likely to purchase them, as they fail to entice the customers, due to it being perceived as an item of low quality.

See also
List of smoking bans in Australia

References

External links 

 Death of the Queensland tobacco industry photographs, State Library of Queensland